Qeshlaq-e Moranlu (also Romanized as Qeshlāq-e Morānlū and Qeshlāq-e Mūrānlū; also known as Nūralū) is a village in Zahray-ye Bala Rural District, in the Central District of Buin Zahra County, Qazvin Province, Iran. At the 2006 census, its population was 569, in 130 families.

References 

Populated places in Buin Zahra County